Theresia L M Russ was a  cargo ship that was built in 1927 by Neptun AG, Rostock, Germany for Ernst Russ. She was requisitioned by the Kriegsmarine for two years during the Second World War. In 1944, she was sunk by bombing at Gotenhafen, German occupied Poland. The ship was raised and repaired in 1945. She was seized by the Allies at Copenhagen and passed to the Ministry of War Transport (MoWT) and renamed Empire Concrete.

In 1946, she was passed to the Dutch Government and renamed Velsen. She was sold into merchant service in 1947 and renamed Cronenburgh. In 1955, she was sold to Italy and renamed Astor under Panamanian management. She served until scrapped in 1970.

Description
The ship was built in 1927 by Neptun AG, Rostock, as yard number 413.

She had a GRT of 1,6964 and a NRT of 993. Her DWT was 2,658.

The engine was built by AG Neptun.

History
Theresia L M Russ was built for Ernst Russ, Hamburg. The Code Letters RGNK were allocated. She made her maiden voyage on 20 December 1927. On 26 July 1932, Theresa L M Russ rescued the 40 survivors from the Reichsmarine training schooner Niobe, which had capsized off Fehmarn in a squall. In 1934, her Code Letters were changed to DHXN. Theresia L M Russ rescued her crew of 14, who had taken to the lifeboats. They were landed at Gibraltar. On 9 April 1940, Theresia L M Russ was requisitioned at Bergen, Norway by the Kriegsmarine. She was returned to Ernst Russ on 29 April. On 15 August 1940, she was again requisitioned by the Kriegsmarine. Theresia L M Russ was returned to her owners on 23 May 1942. She was damaged in an air raid on 26 February 1944 at Helsinki, Finland. On 18 December 1944, Theresia L M Russ was sunk in a Royal Air Force raid on Gotenhafen, German-occupied Poland. On 13 January 1945, she entered dry dock for repairs.

Theresia L M Russ was seized by the Allies in May 1945 at Flensburg. She arrived at Methil, Fife on 4 July 1945. Theresia L M Russ was passed to the MoWT and renamed Empire Concrete. Her port of registry was London. The Code Letter GLOL and United Kingdom Official Number 180708 were allocated. She was operated under the management of Stockwood, Rees & Co Ltd. On 25 October 1946, Empire Concrete was transferred to the Dutch Government and renamed Velsen. She was placed under the management of Wm Müller & Co NV, Rotterdam.

On 9 February 1947, Velsen was sold to Müllers and renamed Cronenburgh. Her port of registry was changed to Rotterdam and the Code Letters PDMW were allocated. On 20 July 1948, Cronenburgh grounded on a voyage between Stockholm and Mäntyluoto, Finland. It was subsequently discovered that she was leaking and she was drydocked for repairs.

In 1955, Cronenburgh was sold to U Gennari & Co, Italy. She was operated under the management of Compania de Navigation Caribbean Cargo Carriers SA, Panama and was renamed Astor. When IMO Numbers were introduced, Astor was allocated number 5102755. On 15 February 1970, Astor was on a voyage from Algiers to Oran when she suffered damage to her boilers. She was sold on 9 March 1970 to Industry Varie SJV, La Spezia, Italy and arrived there under tow. Scrapping commenced on 23 March 1970.

References

1927 ships
Ships built in Rostock
Steamships of Germany
Merchant ships of Germany
Maritime incidents in 1932
World War II merchant ships of Germany
Auxiliary ships of the Kriegsmarine
Maritime incidents in December 1944
Maritime incidents in 1948
Ministry of War Transport ships
Empire ships
Steamships of the United Kingdom
Merchant ships of the United Kingdom
Ships sunk by British aircraft
Steamships of the Netherlands
Merchant ships of the Netherlands
Steamships of Panama
Merchant ships of Panama